Eithne Pádraigín Ní Bhraonáin (anglicised Enya Patricia Brennan; born 17 May 1961), known mononymously as Enya, is an Irish singer, songwriter, and musician. Noted for her modern Celtic music, she is a best-selling Irish solo artist and the second-best-selling Irish musical act overall after the rock band U2.

Born into a musical family and raised in the Irish-speaking area of Gaoth Dobhair, Enya began her career in 1980 when she joined her family's Celtic folk band Clannad. She left Clannad in 1982 to pursue a solo career with Clannad's manager and producer Nicky Ryan and Ryan's wife Roma Ryan as her lyricist. Over the following four years, she developed her sound by combining multitracked vocals and keyboards with elements of musical genres such as Celtic, classical, church, new age, world, pop, and Irish folk.

Enya's first solo projects included soundtrack work for The Frog Prince (1985) and the BBC documentary series The Celts (1987), which was released as her debut album Enya (1987). She signed with Warner Music UK, which granted her considerable artistic freedom and minimal interference. The commercial and critical success of Watermark (1988) propelled her to worldwide fame, helped mostly by the international hit single "Orinoco Flow". This was followed by the multi-million-selling albums Shepherd Moons (1991), The Memory of Trees (1995), and A Day Without Rain (2000). Sales of A Day Without Rain and its lead single, "Only Time", surged in the United States following its use in media coverage of the 9/11 attacks. After Amarantine (2005) and And Winter Came... (2008), Enya took a four-year break from music, returning in 2012 to begin work on her eighth album Dark Sky Island (2015).

Early life

Eithne Pádraigín Ní Bhraonáin (known as Enya) was born in the Dore area of Gweedore on 17 May 1961, and was the sixth of nine children born to Catholic parents who were part of the Brennan family of musicians. Her father, Leo Brennan, was the leader of an Irish showband called the Slieve Foy Band and ran Leo's Tavern in Meenaleck. Her mother, Máire (née Duggan), had distant Spanish roots with ancestors who settled on Tory Island, and was an amateur musician who played in the Slieve Foy Band. She also taught music at Gweedore Community School. Enya grew up in Gweedore, a region where Irish is the primary language. Her name is anglicised as Enya Patricia Brennan, with "Enya" being the phonetic spelling of how "Eithne" is pronounced in her native Ulster dialect. "Ní Bhraonáin" translates to "daughter of Brennan". 

Enya's maternal grandfather, Aodh, was the headmaster of the primary school in Dore where her grandmother was a teacher. Aodh was also the founder of the Gweedore Theatre company. Enya described her upbringing as "very quiet and happy". At the age of three, she participated in her first singing competition which was at the annual Feis Ceoil music festival. She took part in pantomimes at Gweedore Theatre and sang with her siblings in her mother's choir at St Mary's church in Derrybeg. 

Enya learned English at primary school and began piano lessons at age four. She later said, "I had to do school work and then travel to a neighboring town for piano lessons, and then more school work. I remember my brothers and sisters playing outside and I would be inside playing the piano, this one big book of scales, practising them over and over." From the age of 11, Enya attended a convent boarding school in Milford run by the Sisters of Loreto, and her education there was paid for by her grandfather. The boarding school was where Enya developed a taste for classical music, art, Latin, and watercolour painting. She said, "It was devastating to be torn away from such a large family but it was good for my music." Enya left the school at 17 and studied classical music in college for one year intending to become a piano teacher because she "never thought of [herself] composing or being on stage".

Career

1980–1985: Clannad and early solo career
In 1970, several members of Enya's family formed Clannad, a Celtic folk band. Clannad hired Nicky Ryan as their manager, sound engineer, and producer, and Ryan's future wife, Roma Ryan, as tour manager and administrator. In 1980, after her year at college, Enya decided not to pursue a music degree at university and instead accepted Ryan's invitation to join Clannad, having wanted to expand their sound with keyboards and an additional vocalist. Enya performed an uncredited role on their sixth studio album, Crann Úll (1980), with a line-up of siblings Máire, Pól, and Ciarán Brennan, and twin uncles Noel and Pádraig Duggan. She features in their follow-up, Fuaim (1981), as a full-time member. Nicky said it was not his intention to make Enya a permanent member, as she was "fiercely independent [...] intent on playing her own music. She was just not sure of how to go about it." This sparked discussions between the two on layering vocals to create a "choir of one", a concept inspired by Phil Spector's Wall of Sound technique that had interested them.

During a Clannad tour in 1982, Nicky called for a band meeting to address internal issues that had arisen. He recalled: "It was short and only required a vote, I was a minority of one and lost. Roma and I were out. This left the question of what happened with Enya. I decided to stand back and say nothing." Enya chose to leave with the Ryans and pursue a solo career, having felt confined in the group and disliked being "somebody in the background". The split caused some friction between the parties, but they settled their differences.

Nicky suggested to Enya that either she return to Gweedore "with no particular definite future", or live with him and Roma in Artane, Dublin, "and see what happens, musically", which Enya accepted. After their bank denied them a loan, Enya sold her saxophone and gave piano lessons for income. The Ryans used what they could afford to build a recording facility in their garden shed which they named Aigle Studio, after the French word for eagle. They also rented the studio out to other musicians to help recoup the costs. The trio formed a musical and business partnership, with Nicky as Enya's producer and arranger and Roma as her lyricist. They called their company Aigle Music. In the following two years, Enya developed her technique and composition by listening to recordings of her reciting pieces of classical music and repeated this process until she started to improvise sections and develop her own arrangements. Her first composition was "An Aibhse Uaighneach", Irish for "The Lonely Ghost". During this time Enya played the synthesiser on Ceol Aduaidh (1983) by Mairéad Ní Mhaonaigh and Frankie Kennedy, and declined an offer by Mike Oldfield to sing on his single "Moonlight Shadow".

Enya's first solo endeavour arrived in 1983 when she recorded two piano instrumentals, "An Ghaoth Ón Ghrian", Irish for "The Solar Wind", and "Miss Clare Remembers". Both were recorded at Windmill Lane Studios in Dublin and released on Touch Travel (1984), a limited-release cassette of music from various artists on the Touch label. She is credited as Eithne Ní Bhraonáin in the liner notes. After several months of preparation, Enya's first live solo performance took place at the National Stadium in Dublin on 23 September 1983, which was televised for RTÉ's music show Festival Folk. Niall Morris, a musician who worked with her during this time, recalled she "was so nervous she could barely get on stage, and she cowered behind the piano until the gig was over".

Morris assisted Enya in the production of a demo tape, playing additional keyboards to her compositions. Roma thought the music would suit accompanying visuals and sent it to various film producers. Among them was David Puttnam, who liked the tape and offered Enya to compose the soundtrack to his upcoming romantic comedy film, The Frog Prince (1984). Enya scored nine pieces for the film; later, against her wishes, the pieces were rearranged and orchestrated by Richard Myhill, except for two pieces in which she sang, "The Frog Prince" and "Dreams". The words to "Dreams" were penned by Charlie McGettigan. The film editor Jim Clark said the rearrangements were necessary as Enya found it difficult to compose to the picture. Released in 1985, the album is the first commercial release that credits her as "Enya". Nicky Ryan suggested the phonetic spelling of her name, thinking that Eithne would be mispronounced by non-Irish speakers. Enya looked back at her composition work on the film as a good career move, but a disappointing one as "we weren't part of it at the end". Also in 1985, she sang on three tracks on Ordinary Man (1985) by Christy Moore.

1985–1989: The Celts and Watermark

In 1985, producer Tony McAuley asked Enya to contribute a track for the six-part BBC television documentary series The Celts. She had already written a Celtic-influenced song called "The March of the Celts", and submitted it to the project. Each episode was to feature a different composer at first, but director David Richardson liked her track so much that he had Enya score the entire series. Enya recorded 72 minutes of music at Aigle Studio and the BBC studios in Wood Lane, London, without recording to the picture. She was required to portray certain themes and ideas that the producers wanted; but unlike The Frog Prince, she worked with little interference which granted her freedom to establish the sound that she would adopt throughout her future career, signified by layered vocals, keyboard-oriented music, and percussion with elements of Celtic, classical, church, and folk music.

In March 1987, two months before The Celts aired, a 40-minute selection of Enya's score was released as her debut solo album, Enya, by BBC Records in the United Kingdom and by Atlantic Records in the United States. The latter promoted it with a new-age imprint on the packaging, which Nicky later thought was "a cowardly thing for them to do". The album gained enough public attention to reach number 8 on the Irish Albums Chart and number 69 on the UK Albums Chart. "I Want Tomorrow" was released as Enya's first single. "Boadicea" was sampled by The Fugees on their 1996 song "Ready or Not"; the group neither sought permission nor gave credit. Enya took legal action and the group subsequently gave her credit; they paid a fee of approximately $3 million. Later in 1987, Enya appeared on Sinéad O'Connor's debut album The Lion and the Cobra, reciting Psalm 91 in Irish on "Never Get Old".

Several weeks after the release of Enya, Enya secured a recording contract with Warner Music UK after Rob Dickins, the label's chairman and a fan of Clannad, took a liking to Enya and found himself playing it "every night before I went to bed". He later met Enya and the Ryans at a chance meeting at the Irish Recorded Music Association award ceremony in Dublin, where he learned that Enya had entered negotiations with a rival label. Dickins seized the opportunity and signed her, in doing so granting her wish to write and record with artistic freedom, minimal interference from the label, and without set deadlines to finish albums. Dickins said: "Sometimes you sign an act to make money, and sometimes you sign an act to make music. This was the latter... I just wanted to be involved with this music." Enya left Atlantic and signed with the Warner-led Geffen Records to handle her American distribution.

With the green-light to produce a new album, Enya recorded Watermark from June 1987 to April 1988. It was initially recorded in analogue at Aigle before Dickins requested to have it re-recorded digitally at Orinoco Studios in Bermondsey, London. Watermark was released in September 1988 and became an unexpected hit, reaching number 5 in the United Kingdom and number 25 on the Billboard 200 in the United States following its release there in January 1989. Its lead single, "Orinoco Flow", was the last song written for the album. It was not intended to be a single at first, but Enya and the Ryans chose it after Dickins jokingly asked for a single; he knew that Enya's music was not made for the Top 40 chart. Dickins and engineer Ross Cullum are referenced in the song's lyrics. "Orinoco Flow" became an international top 10 hit and was number one in the United Kingdom for three weeks. The new-found success propelled Enya to international fame and she received endorsement deals and offers to use her music in television commercials. She spent one year traveling worldwide to promote the album which increased her exposure through interviews, appearances, and live performances.

1989–1997: Shepherd Moons and The Memory of Trees
After promoting Watermark, Enya purchased new recording equipment and started work on her next album, Shepherd Moons. She found that the success of Watermark caused a considerable amount of pressure when it came to writing new songs, stating, "I kept thinking, 'Would this have gone on Watermark? Is it as good?' Eventually I had to forget about this and start on a blank canvas and just really go with what felt right". Enya wrote songs based on several ideas, including entries from her diary, the Blitz in London, and her grandparents. Shepherd Moons was released in November 1991, her first album released under Warner-led Reprise Records in the United States. It became a greater commercial success than Watermark, reaching number one in the UK for one week and number 17 in the United States. "Caribbean Blue", its lead single, charted at number 13 in the United Kingdom.

In 1991, Warner Music released a collection of five Enya music videos as Moonshadows for home video. In 1993, Enya won her first Grammy Award for Best New Age Album for Shepherd Moons. Soon after, Enya and Nicky entered discussions with Industrial Light & Magic, founded by George Lucas, regarding an elaborate stage lighting system for a proposed concert tour, but nothing resulted from those discussions. In November 1992, Warner obtained the rights to Enya and re-released the album as The Celts with new artwork. It surpassed its initial sale performance, reaching number 10 in the UK.

After traveling worldwide to promote Shepherd Moons, Enya started to write and record her fourth album, The Memory of Trees. The album was released in November 1995. It peaked at number 5 in the UK and number 9 in the US, where it sold over 3 million copies. Its lead single, "Anywhere Is", reached number 7 in the UK. The second, "On My Way Home", reached number 26 in the UK. In late 1994, Enya put out an extended play of Christmas music titled The Christmas EP. Enya was offered to compose the film score for Titanic but declined as it would be a collaboration, rather than solely her composition. A recording of her singing "Oíche Chiúin", an Irish-language version of "Silent Night", appeared on the charity album A Very Special Christmas 3, released in benefit of the Special Olympics in October 1997.

In early 1997, Enya began to select tracks for her first compilation album, "trying to select the obvious ones, the hits, and others." She chose to work on the collection following the promotional tour for The Memory of Trees as she felt it was the right time in her career, and that her contract with WEA required her to release a "best of" album. The set, named Paint the Sky with Stars: The Best of Enya, features two new tracks, "Paint the Sky with Stars" and "Only If...". Released in November 1997, the album was a worldwide commercial success, reaching number 4 in the UK and number. 30 in the US, where it went on to sell over 4 million copies. "Only If..." was released as a single in 1997. Enya described the album as "like a musical diary... each melody has a little story and I live through that whole story from the beginning... your mind goes back to that day and what you were thinking."

1998–2007: A Day Without Rain and Amarantine
Enya started work on her fifth studio album, titled A Day Without Rain, in mid-1998. In a departure from her previous albums, she incorporated the use of a string section into her compositions, something that was not a conscious decision at first, but Enya and Nicky Ryan agreed that it complemented the songs that were being written. The album was released in November 2000 and reached number 6 in the UK and an initial peak of number 17 in the US.

In the aftermath of the 11 September attacks, sales of the album and its lead single, "Only Time", surged after the song was widely used during radio and television coverage of the events, leading to its description as "a post-September 11 anthem". The exposure caused A Day Without Rain to outperform its original chart performance to peak at number 2 on the Billboard 200, and the release of a maxi-single containing the original and a pop remix of "Only Time" in November 2001. Enya donated its proceeds in aid of the International Association of Firefighters. The song topped the Billboard Hot Adult Contemporary Tracks chart and went to number 10 on the Hot 100 singles, Enya's highest charting US single to date.

In 2001, Enya agreed to write and perform on two tracks for the soundtrack of The Lord of the Rings: The Fellowship of the Ring (2001) at the request of director Peter Jackson. Its composer Howard Shore "imagined her voice" as he wrote the film's score, making an uncommon exception to include another artist in one of his soundtracks. After flying to New Zealand to observe the filming and to watch a rough cut of the film, Enya returned to Ireland and composed "Aníron" (the theme for Aragorn and Arwen), with lyrics by Roma in J. R. R. Tolkien's fictional Elvish language Sindarin, and "May It Be", sung in English and another Tolkien language, Quenya. Shore then based his orchestrations around Enya's recorded vocals and themes to create "a seamless sound". In 2002, Enya released "May It Be" as a single which earned her an Academy Award nomination for Best Original Song. She performed the song live with an orchestra at the 74th Academy Awards ceremony in March 2002, and later cited the moment as a career highlight.

Enya undertook additional studio projects in 2001 and 2002. The first was work on the soundtrack of the Japanese romantic film Calmi Cuori Appassionati (2001), which was subsequently released as Themes from Calmi Cuori Appassionati (2001). The album is formed of tracks spanning her career from Enya to A Day Without Rain with two B-sides. The album went to number 2 in Japan and became Enya's second album to sell one million copies in the country.

In September 2003, Enya returned to Aigle Studio to start work on her sixth studio album, Amarantine. Roma said the title means "everlasting". The album marks the first instance of Enya singing in Loxian, a fictional language created by Roma that came about when Enya was working on "Water Shows the Hidden Heart". After numerous attempts to sing the song in English, Irish, and Latin, Roma suggested a new language based on some of the sounds Enya would sing along to when developing her songs. It was a success, and Enya sang "Less Than a Pearl" and "The River Sings" in the same way. Roma worked on the language further, creating a "culture and history" behind it surrounding the Loxian people who are on another planet, questioning the existence of life outside of Earth. "Sumiregusa (Wild Violet)" is sung in Japanese. Amarantine was a global success, reaching number 6 on the Billboard 200 and number 8 in the UK. It has sold over 1 million certified copies in the US, a considerable drop in sales in comparison to her previous albums. Enya dedicated the album to BBC producer Tony McAuley who had commissioned Enya to write the soundtrack to The Celts, following his death in 2003. The lead single, "Amarantine", was released in December 2005.

In June 2007, Enya received an honorary doctorate from the National University of Ireland, Galway. A month later, she also received one from the University of Ulster.

2008–present: And Winter Came... and Dark Sky Island
Enya wrote music with a winter and Christmas theme for her seventh studio album, And Winter Came... Initially, she intended to make an album of seasonal songs and hymns set for a release in late 2007 but decided to produce a winter-themed album instead. The track "My! My! Time Flies!", a tribute to the late Irish guitarist Jimmy Faulkner, incorporates a guitar solo performed by Pat Farrell, the first use of a guitar on an Enya album since "I Want Tomorrow" from Enya. The lyrics also include atypical pop-culture references, such as The Beatles' famous photo shoot for the cover of Abbey Road. Upon its release in November 2008, And Winter Came... reached number 6 in the UK and number 8 in the US and sold almost 3.5 million copies worldwide by 2011.

After promoting And Winter Came..., Enya took an extended break from writing and recording music. She spent her time resting, visiting family in Australia, and renovating her new home in the south of France. In March 2009, her first four studio albums were reissued in Japan in the Super High Material CD format with bonus tracks. Her second compilation album, The Very Best of Enya, was released in November 2009 and featured songs from 1987 to 2008, including a previously unreleased version of "Aníron" and a DVD compiling most of her music videos to date. In 2013, "Only Time" was used in the "Epic Split" advertisement by Volvo Trucks starring Jean-Claude Van Damme who does the splits while suspended between two lorries.

In 2012, Enya returned to the studio to record her eighth album, Dark Sky Island. Its name refers to the island of Sark, which became the first island to be designated a dark-sky preserve, and a series of poems on islands by Roma Ryan. Upon its release on 20 November 2015, Dark Sky Island went to number 4 in the UK, Enya's highest charting studio album there since Shepherd Moons went to number 1, and to number 8 in the US. A Deluxe Edition features three additional songs. Enya completed a promotional tour of the UK, Europe, the US, and Japan. During her visit to Japan, Enya performed "Orinoco Flow" and "Echoes in Rain" at the Universal Studios Japan Christmas show in Osaka. In December 2016, Enya appeared on the Irish television show Christmas Carols from Cork, marking her first Irish television appearance in over seven years. She sang "Adeste Fideles", "Oiche Chiúin", and "The Spirit of Christmas Past".

In November 2020, a "watch party" video was posted on Enya's official YouTube channel to commemorate the 20th anniversary of A Day Without Rain and included introductory messages from Enya and the Ryans. The trio did the same thing for the 30th anniversary of Shepherd Moons, on 4 November 2021. In his introductory message, Nicky Ryan said that they used the downtime from the COVID-19 pandemic to renovate Aigle Studio and install new recording equipment and instruments. He stated that when the work was finished, Enya will start working on new music.

Musical style
Enya's vocal range has been described as mezzo-soprano, "ethereal, floating soprano" and "pure, lyric soprano". . She has cited her musical foundations as "the classics", church music, and "Irish reels and jigs" with a particular interest in Sergei Rachmaninoff, a favourite composer of hers. She has an autographed picture of him in her home. Since 1982, she has recorded her music with Nicky Ryan as producer and arranger and his wife Roma Ryan as a lyricist. While in Clannad, Enya chose to work with Nicky as the two shared an interest in vocal harmonies, and Ryan, influenced by The Beach Boys and the "Wall of Sound" technique that Phil Spector pioneered, wanted to explore the idea of "the multivocals" for which her music became known. According to Enya, "Angeles" from Shepherd Moons has roughly 500 vocals recorded individually and layered. Enya performs all vocals and the majority of instruments in her songs, apart from guest musicians, playing percussion, guitar, violin, uilleann pipes, cornet, and double bass. Her early works, including Watermark, feature numerous keyboards, including the Yamaha KX88 Master, Yamaha DX7, Oberheim Matrix, Kurzweil K250, E-mu Emulator II, Akai S900, Roland D-50 (famously used with the Pizzagogo patch in "Orinoco Flow"), and the Roland Juno-60, the latter a particular favorite of hers.

Numerous critics and reviewers classify Enya's albums as new-age music and she has won four Grammy Awards in the category. However, Enya does not classify her music as part of the genre. When asked what genre she would classify her music, she replied "Enya". Nicky Ryan commented on the new age designation: "Initially it was fine, but it's really not new age. Enya plays a whole lot of instruments, not just keyboards. Her melodies are strong and she sings a lot. So I can't see a comparison." The music video for "Caribbean Blue" and the artwork for The Memory of Trees feature adapted works from artist Maxfield Parrish.

In addition to her native Irish, Enya has recorded songs in languages including English, French, Latin, Spanish, and Welsh. She has recorded music influenced by works from fantasy author J. R. R. Tolkien, including the instrumental "Lothlórien" from Shepherd Moons. For The Lord of the Rings: The Fellowship of the Ring, she sang "May It Be" in English and Tolkien's fictional language Quenya, and she sang "Aníron" in another of Tolkien's fictional languages, Sindarin. Amarantine and Dark Sky Island include songs sung in Loxian, a fictional language created by Roma Ryan, that has no official syntax. Its vocabulary was formed by Enya singing the song's notes to which Roma wrote their phonetic spelling.

Enya adopted a composing and songwriting method that has deviated little throughout her career. At the start of the recording process for an album, she enters the studio, forgetting about her previous success, fame, and songs of hers that became hits. "If I did that", she said, "I'd have to call it a day". She then develops ideas on the piano, keeping note of any arrangement that can be worked on further. During her time writing, Enya works a five-day week, takes weekends off, and does not work on her music at home. With Irish as her first language, Enya initially records her songs in Irish as she can express "feeling much more directly" in Irish than in English. After some time, Enya presents her ideas to Nicky to discuss what pieces work best, while Roma works in parallel to devise lyrics for the songs. Enya considered "Fallen Embers" from A Day Without Rain a perfect time when the lyrics reflect how she felt while writing the song. In 2008, she newly discovered her tendency to write "two or three songs" during the winter months, work on the arrangements and lyrics the following spring and summer, and then work on the next couple of songs when autumn arrives.

Live performances
Enya says that Warner Music and she "did not see eye to eye" initially as the label imagined her performing on stage "with a piano... maybe two or three synthesizer players and that's it". Enya also explained that the time put into her studio albums caused her to "run overtime", leaving little time to plan for other such projects. She also expressed the difficulty in recreating her studio-oriented sound for the stage. In 1996, Ryan said Enya had received an offer worth almost £500,000 to perform a concert in Japan. In 2016, Enya spoke about the prospect of a live concert when she revealed talks with the Ryans during her three-year break after And Winter Came... (2008) to perform a show at the Metropolitan Opera House in New York City that would be simulcast to cinemas worldwide. Before such an event could happen, Nicky suggested that she enter a studio and record "all the hits" live with an orchestra and choir to see how they would sound.

Enya has sung with live and lip-syncing vocals on various talk and music shows, events, and ceremonies throughout her career, most often during her worldwide press tours for each album. In December 1995, she performed "Anywhere Is" at a Christmas concert at Vatican City with Pope John Paul II in attendance; he later met and thanked her for performing. In April 1996, Enya performed the same song during her surprise appearance at the fiftieth birthday celebration for Carl XVI Gustaf, the King of Sweden and a fan of Enya's. In 1997, Enya participated in a live Christmas Eve broadcast in London and flew to County Donegal afterward to join her family for their annual midnight Mass choral performance, in which she participates each year. In March 2002, she performed "May It Be" with an orchestra at the year's Academy Awards ceremony. Enya and her sisters performed as part of the local choir Cor Mhuire in July 2005 at St. Mary's church in Gweedore during the annual Earagail Arts Festival.

Legacy
In 1991, a minor planet first discovered in 1978, 6433 Enya, was named after her. In 2017, a newly discovered species of fish, Leporinus enyae, found in the Orinoco River drainage area, was also named after her.

Personal life

Known for her staunchly private lifestyle, Enya has said, "The music is what sells. Not me, or what I stand for... that's the way I've always wanted it." She is unmarried and has no children, but has many nieces and nephews and is considered an aunt to the Ryans' two daughters, having shared their Artane home for some years. In 1991, she said, "I'm afraid of marriage because I'm afraid someone might want me because of who I am instead of because they loved me... I wouldn't go rushing into anything unexpected, but I do think a great deal about this." A relationship she had with one man ended in 1997, around the time when she considered taking time out of music to have a family, but found she was putting pressure on herself over the matter and "gone the route [she] wanted to go". She has identified herself as "more spiritual than religious" and has said that she sometimes prays, but prefers "going into churches when they're empty".

At an auction in 1997, Enya spent an estimated €3.8 million on a 157-year-old Victorian Grade-A listed castellated mansion in Killiney. Formerly known as Victoria Castle and Ayesha Castle, she renamed it Manderley Castle after the house featured in Daphne du Maurier's novel Rebecca (1938). She spent seven years and approximately €300,000 renovating the property and installing considerable security measures because of threats from stalkers. In late 2005, the property had two security breaches; during one incident, two people attacked and tied up one of her housekeepers before stealing several items. Enya alerted police by raising an alarm in her safe room.

Discography

The discography of Enya includes 26.5 million certified album sales in the United States and an estimated 80 million record sales worldwide, making her one of the best-selling musicians of all time. A Day Without Rain is the best-selling new-age album, with an estimated 16 million copies sold worldwide. Enya's awards include seven World Music Awards, four Grammy Awards for Best New Age Album, and an Ivor Novello Award. She was nominated for an Academy Award and a Golden Globe Award for "May It Be", a song she wrote for the film The Lord of the Rings: The Fellowship of the Ring (2001).

Studio albums
 Enya (1987) (reissued in 1992 as The Celts)
 Watermark (1988)
 Shepherd Moons (1991)
 The Memory of Trees (1995)
 A Day Without Rain (2000)
 Amarantine (2005)
 And Winter Came... (2008)
 Dark Sky Island (2015)

Awards and nominations
Billboard Music Awards

|-
| rowspan=4|2001
| rowspan=2|Enya
| Top Billboard 200 Artist - Female
| 
|-
| Top New Age Artist
| 
|-
| rowspan=3|A Day Without Rain
| Top Internet Album
| 
|-
| rowspan=2|Top New Age Album
| 
|-
| rowspan=3|2002
| 
|-
| rowspan=2|Enya
| Top New Age Artist
| 
|-
| Top Adult Contemporary Artist
| 

Grammy Awards

|-
| rowspan=2|1990
| rowspan=2|"Orinoco Flow"
| Best New Age Performance
|
|-
| Best Music Video
|
|-
| 1993
| Shepherd Moons
| rowspan=3|Best New Age Album
|
|-
| 1997
| The Memory of Trees
|
|-
| 2002
| A Day Without Rain
| 
|-
| 2003
| "May It Be"
| Best Song Written for Visual Media
|
|-
| rowspan="2"|2007
| "Drifting"
| Best Pop Instrumental Performance
| 
|-
| Amarantine
| rowspan=2|Best New Age Album
|
|-
| 2017
|  Dark Sky Island
|

IFPI Hong Kong Top Sales Music Awards

!Ref.
|-
| 2001
| A Day Without Rain
| Top 10 Best Sales Foreign Albums
| 
|

Japan Gold Disc Awards

|-
| 1990
| Enya
| New Artist of the Year
| 
|-
| 1998
|  Paint the Sky with Stars
| Best 3 Albums
| 
|-
| 2001
| A Day Without Rain
| International Pop Album of the Year
|
|-
| 2002
| Themes from Calmi Cuori Appassionati
| Best 3 Albums
| 
|-
| 2006
| Amarantine
| International Album of the Year
| 

World Music Awards

|-
| rowspan="2"|2001
| rowspan="7"| Enya
| World's Best Selling Irish Artist
|
|-
| rowspan=2|World's Best Selling New Age Artist
|
|-
| rowspan=3|2002
|
|-
| World's Best Selling Female Artist
|
|-
| rowspan=3|World's Best Selling Irish Artist
|
|-
| 2003
| 
|-
| 2006
| 

Žebřík Music Awards

!Ref.
|-
| 1993
| rowspan=3|Enya
| rowspan=3|Best International Female
| 
| 
|-
| 1997
| 
| 
|-
| 2005
| 
| 

Other awards

|-
!scope="row" rowspan="3"|1989
|rowspan="3"|Enya
| Brit Award for Best International Artist
|
|-
| Brit Award for Best International Female
|
|-
| IRMA Award for Best Female Irish Artist
|
|-
!scope="row"|1990
| "Orinoco Flow"
| BMI Award for Citation of Achievement
|
|-
!scope="row"|1992
|rowspan="3"|Enya
|rowspan="2"|Brit Award for Best International Solo Artist
|
|-
!scope="row" rowspan="3"|1993
|
|-
| IRMA Award for Best Female Irish Artist
|
|-
| "Book of Days"
| Golden Raspberry Award for Worst Original Song
| 
|-
!scope="row" rowspan=1|1998
| Enya, Nicky Ryan, and Roma Ryan
| Ivor Novello Award for International Achievement
|
|-
!scope="row"|2001
| rowspan="4"| "May It Be"
| Critics' Choice Movie Award for Best Song
|
|-
!scope="row"|2001
| Broadcast Film Critics Association for Best Original Song
|
|-
!scope="row"|2002
| Golden Globe Award for Best Original Song
|
|-
!scope="row"|2002
| Academy Award for Best Original Song
|
|-
!scope="row" rowspan="4"|2002
| rowspan="2"| Enya
| American Music Award for Favorite Adult Contemporary Artist
|
|-
| Golden Plate Award of the American Academy of Achievement
|
|-
| rowspan=3|"Only Time"
| ECHO Award for Best Single of the Year (International)
|
|-
| BDSCertified Spin Awards – 300,000 Spins
| 
|-
!scope="row" rowspan="1"|2003
| rowspan="1"|BMI Award for Citation of Achievement
|
|-
!scope="row" rowspan="3"|2004
| rowspan=4|"I Don't Wanna Know"
| Vibe Award for R&B Song of the Year
| 
|-
| MOBO Award for Best Single
| 
|-
| MOBO Award for Best Ringtone
| 
|-
!scope="row"|2005
| BMI Award for Citation of Achievement
|
|-
!scope="row"|2016
| Dark Sky Island
| ECHO Award for Best Female of the Year (International)
|
|-
|}

See also
 Honorific nicknames in popular music
 List of ambient music artists
 List of artists who reached number one on the UK Singles Chart
 List of best-selling music artists
 List of highest-certified music artists in the United States

References

Sources

External links

 
1961 births
20th-century Irish women singers
20th-century women composers
21st-century Irish women singers
21st-century women composers
Celtic fusion musicians
Clannad members
Grammy Award winners
Irish folk singers
Irish pianists
Irish pop singers
Irish women composers
Irish women singer-songwriters
Irish-language singers
Ivor Novello Award winners
Latin-language singers
Living people
Musicians from County Donegal
New-age musicians
People from Gweedore
People from Killiney
Warner Music Group artists
Women in electronic music
World Music Awards winners
20th-century women pianists
21st-century women pianists